Proscopiidae is a family of Neotropical grasshoppers, now placed in its own superfamily, the Proscopioidea. Some species may be known as stick grasshoppers or jumping sticks.

Subfamilies and selected genera
The Orthoptera Species File lists three subfamilies, with several genera unplaced:

 Hybusinae Liana, 1980 (monotypic)
 Hybusa Erichson, 1844
 Proscopiinae Serville, 1838
 Tribe Proscopiini Serville, 1838
 Proscopia Klug, 1820
 Pseudoproscopia Bentos-Pereira, 2006
 Tribe Tetanorhynchini Bentos-Pereira, 2003
 Scleratoscopia Jago, 1990
 Tetanorhynchus Brunner von Wattenwyl, 1890
 Xeniinae Liana, 1980
 Xenium Liana, 1980
 incertae sedis
 Bazylukia Liana, 1972
 Bolidorhynchus Jago, 1990
 Eoproscopia† Heads, 2008 
 Epsigrypa Mello-Leitão, 1939
 Nodutus Liana, 1972
 Orthophastigia Tapia, 1982
 Scopaeoscleratoscopia Jago, 1990

References

External links

 
Orthoptera families
Taxa named by Jean Guillaume Audinet-Serville
Orthoptera of South America